Alan Brown (born 22 May 1959) is an English former professional footballer who played as a forward for Sunderland, Shrewsbury Town, and Doncaster Rovers.

Brown was signed by Doncaster Rovers' manager Billy Bremner from Shrewsbury Town for £35,000 in March 1984. The 1984–85 season started well for Brown with a hat-trick in a win at Reading, however he was injured a little later in the season and despite a two-game comeback the following season he was forced to retire from the game. He made 17 appearances for Rovers, scoring 7 goals.

He is the father of former footballer Chris Brown.

References

1959 births
Living people
Sportspeople from Easington, County Durham
Footballers from County Durham
English footballers
Association football forwards
Sunderland A.F.C. players
Newcastle United F.C. players
Shrewsbury Town F.C. players
Doncaster Rovers F.C. players
English Football League players